The Suburban Rail Loop (SRL) is a group of new rapid transit lines planned or under construction in Melbourne, Victoria, Australia. The project is divided into four distinct sections. The two main sections, SRL East and SRL North, would together form a single  fully automated orbital metro line through the city's middle suburbs, with 13 stations between Cheltenham and Melbourne Airport connecting to eight existing Melbourne rail lines. SRL East is currently under construction and is planned to open in 2035.

The SRL Airport component, in the city's west, would be formed by the separate Melbourne Airport rail link project, which began construction in 2022 and is being delivered by Rail Projects Victoria. This component will run into the central business district via the Metro Tunnel, and is planned to open by 2029. The final section, SRL West, has not been defined in detail by the state government but would connect the city's outer western suburbs and may be formed by electrifying the existing Deer Park–West Werribee railway line and extending it to Werribee station. 

Several orbital rail schemes have been proposed and some constructed throughout Melbourne's history, but the rail network has remained largely radial. The Victorian Labor government led by Premier Daniel Andrews announced the SRL as policy in 2018 in the lead up that year's state election. Initial planning for the SRL was carried out in secret prior to its announcement, and, when the plans were released, it received significant attention. The SRL plan was praised for its long-term vision and ambition, as well as being an innovative solution to the difficulties faced by Melbourne's transport network, but criticised for its political motives and large cost.

SRL East and North would take more than 25 years to construct and together are estimated by the project's business case to cost between $30.7 and $57.6 billion depending on project staging, of which capital costs would be between $24.1 and $45.1 billion. SRL East and North will be built entirely underground along new rail alignments, while SRL Airport will be formed by the at-grade and elevated Melbourne Airport rail link and funded separately.

In 2021, the Victorian government announced that the SRL East, between Cheltenham and Box Hill, would commence construction first and be open by 2035. On 2 June 2022, early works began on SRL East with major construction expected to commence in 2023, followed by tunnelling works in 2026.

Background 

The Melbourne transport network was substantially developed in the late 19th century, when the newly available technology of the railway enabled population growth away from the city centre. The result was the development of a largely radial network, which, over the following century, reinforced a model of urban development focused on heavy daily commuter flows into and out of the CBD. Furthermore, a program of freeway construction in the wake of the 1969 Melbourne Transportation Plan reinforced the structure of the suburbs and introduced car dependence to new regions of development not served by the legacy rail network. As a consequence, Melbourne, unlike many cities of comparable size, did not develop any major centres of employment or dense population in its outlying regions over the course of the 20th century.

A number of orbital lines were constructed at the peak of railway development, but most failed to attract the necessary traffic of passengers and goods to remain sustainable into the late 20th century. The Outer Circle, which ran from Oakleigh on the Dandenong line to Fairfield on the Hurstbridge line via the Glen Waverley and Lilydale lines, was constructed between 1888 and 1891 but closed by 1897, though it was partly reopened as the Alamein branch line. The Inner Circle linking the modern-day Upfield and Mernda lines, was opened in 1888 but closed to passengers in 1941. The Albion-Jacana line and Newport-Sunshine line in the city's west, though performing a similar purpose, were never intended to carry passenger traffic.

In the late 20th century, interest grew in enabling orbital journeys between Melbourne suburbs. Included in the 1969 Plan were a number of orbital freeways, virtually all of which were constructed over the following decades. The M80 Ring Road through the outer western and northern suburbs was constructed in stages between 1989 and 1999, and, by the time of its completion, was claimed by its advocates to have been partly responsible for a massive economic boom in the western suburbs, centred on its points of intersection with existing radial routes. EastLink, a similar orbital freeway through the eastern suburbs, opened in 2008, but was less successful, failing to reduce traffic meaningfully on parallel arterials such as Springvale Road. Detailed plans for the North East Link, connecting the Ring Road and EastLink to complete the orbital route, were released in 2018, with construction expected to start in 2020 for an anticipated completion date of 2027.

Despite the investment in orbital road transport from 1990, little changed in the structure of the public transport network. No new suburban railway lines after 1930, and trams were increasingly delayed by traffic congestion on key routes. From 2002, the SmartBus program introduced three orbital bus routes in an attempt to meet the city's burgeoning need for outer suburban public transport. In addition to serving new corridors previously without mass transit, the buses were operated at a relatively high frequency and along direct routes, in contrast to the existing network of infrequent and circuitous routes. As a result, the SmartBus routes became the most heavily used in Melbourne, and were widely praised as a model for recasting the future public transport network.

History

Proposal 
In August 2018, three months prior to the 2018 Victorian state election, incumbent Premier Daniel Andrews promised that a re-elected Labor government would undertake "the biggest public transport building program in Australian history", in a speech to the Committee for Economic Development of Australia. The comments were interpreted as a hint that as-yet-unannounced projects would be revealed closer to the election, although Andrews provided no detail in his speech.

On 27 August, Andrews revealed plans for the Suburban Rail Loop for the first time: a  orbital line for Melbourne's rail network, connecting 11 of the city's existing rail lines and serving new regions of the middle and outer suburbs at an estimated cost of $50 billion. The government committed $300 million to complete a business case and feasibility study should it be re-elected, noting that the project would take several terms of government to complete.

In the days following the proposal, the government revealed that its plan had been under consideration within Development Victoria, a planning agency under the Department of Environment, Land, Water and Planning for 12 months. Controversially, neither Infrastructure Victoria nor Transport for Victoria, both established by the Andrews government, had been involved in the SRL's planning stages; furthermore, neither agency had identified the need for a similar project in their long-term plans for the transport network. Andrews defended the decision to develop the SRL independently of infrastructure authorities, arguing that while Infrastructure Victoria "have lots of good ideas, they don't have every good idea".

The tender process for the Melbourne Airport rail link project was launched in mid-September, and the state government confirmed that it anticipated the airport link would form part of the SRL West, with construction beginning in 2022

In mid-October, Labor federal Leader of the Opposition Bill Shorten announced support for the SRL, including a commitment for $300 million in initial federal funding should the Labor Party be elected. The state government also indicated that it would be prepared to add additional stops to the loop to those included in the original announcement, particularly in the western suburbs.

Days later, a leaked document from Transport for Victoria showed that the SRL had not been included in the transport authority's long-term plan for the rail network.

Planning 
$300 million was allocated to planning works for the SRL in the 2019 state budget. Rail Projects Victoria announced registrations of interest for potential contractors were open in June, and the first geotechnical investigations began in July in Box Hill.

The state government announced the formation of a Suburban Rail Loop Authority in September, at the same time as confirming station precincts for SRL East. In November 2019, the government announced that the loop would be an operationally independent, standalone line using different rail technology from the existing suburban rail network. The system would use new, smaller metro rollingstock that is four to five carriages long, allowing shorter platforms. The Premier announced an intention to use private investment to help fund the line, but did not indicate whether the line would be driverless.

In 2020, the government committed a further $2.2 billion for initial and early works on the loop, with expressions of interest opened for contractors to deliver these works. Jacinta Allan, who in her role as Minister for Transport Infrastructure had overseen the SRL since its inception, was given the additional role of Minister for the Suburban Rail Loop.

Release of Business and Investment Case

The Business and Investment Case of SRL was released in August 2021, primarily focusing on SRL East and North. SRL East will commence building in 2022 and is expected to finish by 2035. The rail line will be fully underground between Cheltenham and the Airport, while SRL West is subject to further investigation, planning and development. 

The business case modelled two staging scenarios. The first scenario has SRL North opening in two sections, the first from Box Hill to Reservoir opening in 2043 and the second between Reservoir and the Airport opening in 2053. This scenario has estimated capital costs of $24.1 to $40.2 billion and total costs of $30.7 to $50.5 billion, with estimated benefits of $48.5 to $58.7 billion. The second scenario is faster but higher cost and has the section from Box Hill to Reservoir opening by 2038 and the full SRL North corridor from Box Hill to the Airport opening by 2043. This scenario had capital costs of $27.1 to $45.1 billion, total costs of $35.1 to $57.6 billion and benefits of $54.7 to $65.8 billion. The timing and cost would be further refined through the tender and planning process. This gave the project a cost-benefit ratio range between 1.0 and 1.7.

The government stated that it expected $30 to $34.5 billion would be spent on the project over the 14 years to the opening of the first stage in 2035, with significant works on SRL North taking place as part of that expenditure. 

An Environmental Effects Statement (EES) process for SRL East was initiated in late 2021 that provided more detail on the station locations, the precinct designs, the local effects of the project and the design of the train system. Community and stakeholder consultation was launched as part of this process. 

In October 2021, the Minister for Transport Infrastructure Jacinta Allan introduced legislation to the Victorian Parliament to establish the Suburban Rail Loop Authority as a statutory government body and grant it a number of transport and planning powers.

2022 state election campaign 
Then Opposition Leader Mathew Guy announced he would cancel the Suburban Rail Loop if the Liberal party won the 2022 state election, arguing that the project was a waste of money. The SRL became a major and contentious issue during the campaign, with Guy pledging to reallocated the saved money to health infrastructure. Described by some commentators as a politically risky move in Melbourne's eastern suburbs that would be connected by the line, Guy committed to honour the $2.2 billion early works contract but reappropriate the remaining $9.6 billion allocated to the SRL by the government. During the campaign, there was significant debate in the media over the project's cost and value for money. After the Labor government won a third term at the election with an increased majority, Premier Daniel Andrews said the result was the second clear endorsement of the project by Victorian voters.

SRL East construction

Early works 
In November 2021, the State Government committed $9.3 billion in funding towards SRL East on top of $2.5 billion previously allocated for planning and early works. Engineering firm Laing O'Rourke was awarded the contract to deliver early works, which were set to begin in 2022. 

In March 2022, a tender process was opened for two major works packages to deliver the SRL East tunnels. The first is a  tunnel contract between Cheltenham and Glen Waverley, the second is from Glen Waverley to Box Hill. The government announced that up to ten tunnel boring machines would be used to dig SRL East.

In May 2022, prior to the 2022 Australian federal election, Labor leader Anthony Albanese pledged $2.2 billion in federal funding for the SRL if his party was elected. Following the party's success at the election, the new Albanese Government allocated the money in its October 2022-3 budget.

In June 2022, construction work began on the project with early works and utility relocations commencing at the Clayton precinct.

Major construction 
In August 2022, the Victorian Environment Minister Lily D'Ambrosio approved the Environment Effects Statement planning process, meaning the project could proceed to other necessary planning approvals and towards major construction. The approval recommended a number of extra actions by the SRLA to minimise impacts to local residents, including replacing open space on the project, limiting construction noise, additional cycling and walking connections, and more support for local businesses.

Project description 

The 2021 Environmental Effects Statement outlined the key design elements of the project, saying the SRL would provide a high-frequency metro service with fully automated, four-car trains. The trains would be approximately 93 metres long, 3.2 metres wide and 4 metres high, capable of an operating line speed of 100 kilometres per hour, running on an alternating current system. This design differs from Melbourne's existing heavy rail system, which uses longer, heavier rolling-stock on a direct current power system.

The project has two initial stages, SRL East and SRL North, which will consist of 13 stations and twin tunnels running  from Cheltenham in the city's south-east to Melbourne Airport in the north-west. The design of a future western stage from the airport to Werribee was not detailed in the project's 2021 business case. SRL East will be the first section to be built, with planning and construction to move immediately onto SRL North. SRL East from Cheltenham to Box Hill is planned to be open by 2035, with SRL North to then open in two stages, the first from Box Hill to Reservoir, and the second from Reservoir to Melbourne Airport.

Stations will be two level, with large concourses and escalators, with interchanges to connecting train and bus services. Stations are also set to include bicycle parking, over-site developments and broader precinct redevelopments. A train stabling and maintenance facility is planned to be built in Heatherton on a former landfill site to accommodate the train fleet for both SRL East and North.

Under state legislation passed in 2021, the Suburban Rail Loop Authority was given planning powers over the area  from each SRL station. This grants the authority the power to bypass local councils and rezone or develop land in the station precincts, allowing for increased housing and job density, a move that prompted criticism from councils.

Proposed route 

The SRL consists of four sections. SRL East and SRL North will form one continuous metro line stretching  from Cheltenham to Melbourne Airport. The two western sections, SRL Airport and SRL West, are separate lines formed by distinct projects that would require an interchange to access.

The SRL Strategic Assessment produced by Development Victoria in 2018 identified four distinct sections of the route, some of which are formed by other projects or existing rail corridors. The overall corridor selected was originally identified as a "middle" corridor, and was assessed against other routes closer to and further from the CBD before being prioritised for further investigation.

SRL East 
SRL East will run between Southland station on the Frankston line and Box Hill station on the Belgrave and Lilydale lines and will be entirely underground along a new alignment. From south to north, SRL East would also include stations at Clayton on the Dandenong rail corridor; Monash University's Clayton campus; Glen Waverley station, the terminus of Glen Waverley line; and Burwood, near the main campus of Deakin University. Government press releases identify Clayton as the location of a "super-hub", allowing interchange between SRL services, frequent Dandenong corridor services, and regional Gippsland line services. 

A train stabling and maintenance depot will be built between Southland and Clayton stations in the suburb of Heatherton at the current Kingston Road landfill site. The rail line will briefly surface to enter the depot, which will initially house 13 trains but will be large enough to accommodate 30.

SRL East began construction in 2022 and is planned to open by 2035.

SRL North 
SRL North between Box Hill station and Melbourne Airport would be constructed after SRL East, and include stops at Doncaster, a middle suburb long proposed for the terminus of a new rail line; Heidelberg station on the Hurstbridge line; Reservoir station on the Mernda line; Bundoora, home to the main campus of La Trobe University; Broadmeadows station on the Craigieburn line; and the airport itself. This section of the SRL would also be constructed entirely underground, and Broadmeadows would function as a "super-hub" for the Seymour and North East regional lines.

The 2021 SRL business case proposed opening SRL North in two stages, the first running from Box Hill to Reservoir and the second between Reservoir and Melbourne Airport.

SRL Airport (Melbourne Airport Rail) 

The under-construction Melbourne Airport rail link between the airport and Sunshine station will form the SRL Airport section of the loop, with one intermediate station at Keilor East. Trains will not continue onto Werribee, however, but will run into the Melbourne CBD via the Metro Tunnel. Interchange would be required at Melbourne Airport station and Sunshine station to connect with other sections of the SRL.

This section would be mostly constructed along the existing railway corridor at surface level, commencing construction at the same time as the SRL East section in 2022. It is planned to open in 2029.

SRL West 
Apart from the termini at Sunshine and Werribee, the Strategic Assessment did not identify specific routes, intermediate stations or connections to other lines for SRL West, and suggested it would be the final section constructed. The Western Rail Plan published by Transport for Victoria in October 2018 suggested that the role of SRL West could be undertaken by electrifying the Deer Park - West Werribee line to Wyndham Vale station as an extension of the radial suburban network, and extending the Werribee line to meet it at Wyndham Vale. Later documents released by the government confirmed that Wyndham Vale would become an interchange station.

Reception

Political 
Federal Infrastructure Minister Alan Tudge said that the Suburban Rail Loop's "big vision is great" but said the federal government would withhold its support until further details and costings of the plan were provided.

Following the plan's original announcement, federal Labor leader Bill Shorten said that he "liked the principle" of the SRL, but would not immediately commit to supporting it with federal funding. He announced federal Labor's official support in mid-October 2018, committing $300 million in business case funding and saying the project responded to an "old map of Melbourne... [that] simply doesn't work any more". His infrastructure spokesman, Anthony Albanese, said that "this project here in Melbourne is the most transformative project for any capital city in Australia". Shorten later called the project the "Holy Grail" of public transport projects.

State opposition treasury spokesman Michael O'Brien said that the SRL was a "plan for the next election rather than a plan for the next generation", and called on the government to send its plans to Infrastructure Victoria for independent costings and analysis.

The plan was embraced by influential former Liberal premier Jeff Kennett, who called for bipartisan support for the project immediately after it was announced, despite expressing doubts about the accuracy of the $50 billion costing.

At the election of November 2018, the traditionally Liberal-held seats of Mount Waverley, Burwood and Box Hill – all falling along the path of the SRL proposal – were claimed by the Labor Party after large swings, leading to speculation among Labor MPs and electoral commentators that the SRL announcement had contributed significantly to the government being returned with an increased majority. The phenomenon was also replicated in a number of safe Labor seats which would benefit from the line. The project was also a major issue at the 2022 state election, where similar results were seen in Melbourne's east.

Media 
The Age, in its editorial the day following the announcement, wrote that "there are so many reasons to endorse this proposal that it’s easy to get carried away", but observed that "good government is ultimately about more than just vision. It’s about having the inventiveness, discipline and fiscal capacity to make that vision reality", and suggested that the true test for the SRL would be the government's ability to complete it. Herald Sun political editor Matt Johnston was less supportive of what he called a "highly political" project, arguing that the comparisons to other major global cities ignored the fact that "Australia is fairly remote, has a relatively small population and has higher labour costs". However, Johnston also noted that "the route of the suburban rail loop... would go near to, or through, Liberal-held state seats such as Mount Waverley and Burwood [and] near to, or through, federal Liberal seats such as Chisholm and Deakin".

Experts and lobby groups 
The SRL was warmly received by the Public Transport Users Association, with spokesman Daniel Bowen describing it as "Big City thinking" in an opinion piece. Prominent public transport advocate Graham Currie also supported the plan for its potential to induce new development in the outer suburbs, although he admitted being stunned by the government's secretive planning process. The Royal Automobile Club of Victoria also offered in-principle support, saying that "it makes sense for the state to protect a rail corridor through what is now 'middle Melbourne'", although it also argued that the SRL should not overshadow other improvements to the network such as Melbourne Metro 2.

The SRL plan was criticised by rail lobby group the Rail Futures Institute, who argued that its benefits could be produced by a substantially cheaper network of orbital light rail routes. Marion Terill of the Grattan Institute was also critical, saying that travel demand did not warrant the investment required for the SRL.

Public 
Media outlets reported massive levels of public support after the initial announcement of the plan. An impromptu competition organised by The Age to redesign the Melbourne rail network map to incorporate the SRL received entries from leading cartographers and attracted thousands of public votes in the days after the announcement.

Criticism

Cost 
Both the plausibility and practicality of the government's initial headline $50 billion construction cost for the project were the subject of significant commentary at the time of the SRL's original announcement. 

Political opponents suggested that the government had wildly understated the cost of the project, with former premier Jeff Kennett calling the figure "irresponsibly and fraudulently inaccurate", state opposition spokesmen suggesting the cost could be between $50 and $100 billion, and federal infrastructure minister Alan Tudge later saying he believed $100–150 billion was a more likely range. Independent experts agreed that the project was likely to ultimately cost more than the government's claim. Prominent transport commentator Daniel Bowen, in a "back of the envelope" analysis, concluded that the government was "close to the mark" but expressed reservations about the accuracy of his estimate. All these estimates suggest the tunnel will be more expensive than the $16 billion Gotthard Base Tunnel through the Alps in Europe

Separately, transport planners criticised the promises made by state and federal Labor for a total of $600 million in planning funding. The Age published comments from an engineer arguing that a "competent" business case could be completed for only $5 million. Some commentary also questioned the capacity of the state to fund the project without severe impacts on its fiscal policy, irrespective of its actual cost.

In 2022, Victoria's Parliamentary Budget Office (PBO) released analysis finding that the total construction and operating costs of SRL East and North together between 2022 and 2085 in 2022 dollars would be would be $29.214 billion, significantly less than other public estimates. In nominal terms, not adjusted for yearly inflation, the PBO estimated that SRL East would cost $36.5 billion by 2035, but that SRL East and North would together cost $81.7 billion to build when the final section opens in 2053, and $125 billion when including 30 years of asset expenditure after opening to 2085. The PBO analysis was requested by the State Opposition, and the large headline figure prompted calls in the media for the project to be shelved. Minister Jacinta Allan dismissed the report, saying the Opposition framed the PBO request in order to obtain a large number, including unadjusted asset renewal expenses over fifty years. The PBO found that while the SRL would cost $29.214 billion in 2022 dollars, its benefits would be only between $17.757 billion and $21.133 billion, meaning a cost-benefit ratio of between 0.6 and 0.7 using a 7% discount rate.

Patronage 
The Strategic Analysis released by the government in 2018 projects total daily trips on the SRL of 400,000 by 2051, making the line the busiest in Melbourne. It suggests that morning peak would have a 60:40 ratio of clockwise to counter-clockwise travel, with the balance reversed in the afternoon peak; by comparison, Melbourne's radial lines operate at a 90:10 ratio.

Independent analysis of the plan by SGS Economics in the weeks following its release broadly supported the Strategic Assessment, noting that if the SRL had been in operation in 2018, a  catchment around each station would have captured "roughly: 270,600 jobs, 416,100 residents, 212,300 workers, and 112,600 higher education students". It argued that SRL East, consequently, would have served 30,000–50,000 daily trips if in operation in 2018, with the qualification that the level of service provided would need to make travel time competitive with car journeys. However, it concluded that the benefits and potential patronage of the North-East and two western sections were more nebulous, as their impact would depend on the efficiency with which the project was leveraged to create new development.

Notes

References

External links 
Department of Transport – Suburban Rail Loop
Victoria's Big Build – Suburban Rail Loop
Suburban Rail Loop - Business and Investment Case
Suburban Rail Loop - Appendix B1: SRL Precinct Location Options Assessment Summary

Proposed railway lines in Australia
Proposed rail infrastructure in Australia
Proposed buildings and structures in Melbourne
Railway lines in Melbourne

Underground commuter rail